The Australasian Performing Right Association Awards of 1986 (generally known as APRA Awards) are a series of awards held in 1986. The APRA Music Awards were presented by Australasian Performing Right Association (APRA) and the Australasian Mechanical Copyright Owners Society (AMCOS).

Awards 

Only winners are noted

See also 

 Music of Australia

References

External links 

 APRA official website

1986 in Australian music
1986 music awards
APRA Awards